Giovanni Maria Flick (born 7 November 1940) is an Italian journalist, politician, and jurist.

Career
Flick was born in Cirié, Piedmont, to a Catholic, half-ethnic German family, as the fifth of seven children.

He began his education at the Jesuit liceo, and gained a diploma in law at the Università Cattolica del Sacro Cuore in Milan. He then practiced (1964–1975) at the Rome tribunal, as a judge, then as a prosecutor, was a professor at the University of Perugia, the University of Messina, and, from 1980, the LUISS University of Rome, and also started a career as a lawyer. He contributed editorials to Il Sole 24 Ore and La Stampa.

He was Minister of Justice in Romano Prodi's cabinet in 1996–1998, and presented the Italian Parliament with projects of organic laws meant to implement major judicial reforms which were almost entirely adopted by 1999 (including laws that made sentencing easier for misdemeanors). His experience as Minister got him named Italian representative to the European Commission of Human Rights, during the second Massimo D'Alema cabinet. In 2000, he was chosen by President Carlo Azeglio Ciampi to the office of judge in the Constitutional Court of Italy.

References

External links

1940 births
Living people
People from Cirié
Italian journalists
Italian male journalists
Italian people of German descent
Academic staff of the University of Perugia
Italian Ministers of Justice
Judges of the Constitutional Court of Italy
Presidents of the Constitutional Court of Italy
Università Cattolica del Sacro Cuore alumni
Academic staff of the University of Messina
20th-century Italian judges
21st-century Italian judges